The 2015 Challenger Banque Nationale de Granby was a professional tennis tournament played on outdoor hard courts. It was the 22nd edition, for men, and 5th edition, for women, of the tournament and part of the 2015 ATP Challenger Tour and the 2015 ITF Women's Circuit, offering totals of $100,000, for men, and $50,000, for women, in prize money. It took place in Granby, Quebec, Canada between July 20 and July 26, 2015.

Men's singles main-draw entrants

Seeds

1 Rankings are as of July 13, 2015

Other entrants
The following players received wildcards into the singles main draw:
 Isade Juneau
 Pavel Krainik
 Brayden Schnur
 Denis Shapovalov

The following player entered the singles main draw with a protected ranking:
 Dennis Nevolo

The following players received entry from the qualifying draw:
 Félix Auger-Aliassime
 Nikita Kryvonos
 Raymond Sarmiento
 Andrew Whittington

The following player received entry as a lucky loser:
 Jean-Yves Aubone

Women's singles main-draw entrants

Seeds

1 Rankings are as of July 13, 2015

Other entrants
The following players received wildcards into the singles main draw:
 Ayan Broomfield
 Charlotte Robillard-Millette
 Laura Robson
 Erin Routliffe

The following players received entry from the qualifying draw:
 Allie Halbauer
 Akari Inoue
 Maria Patrascu
 Katherine Sebov

Champions

Men's singles

 Vincent Millot def.  Philip Bester, 6–4, 6–4

Women's singles

 Johanna Konta def.  Stéphanie Foretz, 6–2, 6–4

Men's doubles

 Philip Bester /  Peter Polansky def.  Enzo Couacaud /  Luke Saville, 6–7(5–7), 7–6(7–2), [10–7]

Women's doubles

 Jessica Moore /  Storm Sanders def.  Laura Robson /  Erin Routliffe, 7–5, 6–2

External links
Official website

Challenger Banque Nationale de Granby
Challenger Banque Nationale de Granby
Challenger de Granby
Challenger Banque Nationale de Granby